St. Thomas Aquinas High School was a Roman Catholic senior high school in New Britain, Connecticut.

In 1995 the school established a board, Aquinas Foundation, which implemented fundraisers. Circa 1995 the school had  240 students. The enrollment declined further, and as of 1999 the fundraisers had not resulted in a lot of money going to the school. In the summer of 1999 there were fewer than 100 enrolled students for the upcoming school year, including only 11 9th grade (freshmen) students. In July 1999 the school announced it was closing as the enrollment was too low.

After the closure, the school building was abandoned. In 2016 land planning company TO Design LLC agreed to buy the building for $80,000.

Notable alumni
 Paul Manafort – Class of 1967
Rod Foster - Class of 1979
Toby Driver - Class of 1996
Adam Stern - Major League Baseball player

Notable faculty 

 Stephen V. Kobasa
Jerry DeGregorio (Alumni, Class of 1984)

References

1999 disestablishments in Connecticut
Educational institutions disestablished in 1999
Catholic secondary schools in Connecticut
Schools in Hartford County, Connecticut
New Britain, Connecticut